Penicillium purpurogenum is a plant pathogen infecting strawberries. It produces rubratoxin B, a mycotoxin with anticarcinogenic properties, as well as monascus pigments.

See also 
 List of strawberry diseases

References

External links 
 USDA ARS Fungal Database

Fungal strawberry diseases
Fungi described in 1923
purpurogenum